Maybe It's Love, also known as Eleven Men and a Girl, is an all-talking 1930 pre-Code musical comedy film produced and distributed by Warner Bros. and directed by William A. Wellman. The movie stars Joan Bennett, Joe E. Brown and James Hall. The film is based on George Ade's 1904 play The College Widow and is a remake of Warner's own 1927 silent version of the story, which starred Dolores Costello. The play had also been filmed in 1915, starring Ethel Clayton.

Plot
Upton College President Sheffield (George Irving) is in serious danger of losing his job. For the last twelve years Upton has lost the annual football match against rival Parsons College. The trustees of Upton insist that Sheffield must resign if Upton fails to win the upcoming football match.

Sheffield's daughter Nan (Joan Bennett) overhears the threat of the trustees and tells her friend Yates (Joe E. Brown), a star football player. Together they come up with a scheme to get some of the best football players around to sign up to play for Upton. Nan completely changes her appearance to vamp the various men into thinking she will be interested in them if they attend Upton in the following season and play for the football team.

One by one they all fall for the scheme and sign up for Upton. Sheffield, however, refuses to admit Tommy Nelson (James Hall) into the college because of his poor performance in academics. Because of the coach's insistence on needing him to win the game, Nan helps Tommy sign up under a fictitious name and credentials. All is well until Tommy finds out about Nan's scheme and tells the rest of the team. Just before the game, the Upton team pretends to be drunk in order to teach Nan a lesson. Just as the game is about to begin, the team decides to forgive Nan and they win the game for Upton.

Cast
Joan Bennett as Nan Sheffield
Joe E. Brown as Yates
James Hall as Tommy Nelson
Laura Lee as Betty
Sumner Getchell as Whiskers
George Irving as President Sheffield

All-American Football Team
Bill Banker
George Gibson
Howard Harpster
Kenneth Haycraft
Ray Montgomery
Tim Moynihan
Otto Pommerening
Russ Saunders
Wear Schoonover
Paul Scull
Red Sleight
Coach: Howard Jones

Songs
 "Maybe It's Love"
 "I Love to Do It" (cut from domestic release prints)
 "The All American"
 "Keep It Up for Upton"

Production
Originally planned as a full-scale musical, much of the music was removed before release because of the public's apathy and aversion towards musicals in the autumn of 1930. A longer musical version may have been released in countries outside the United States where a backlash against musicals never occurred. It is unknown whether a copy of this fuller version still exists.

Preservation status
The film is preserved in the Library of Congress and occasionally is broadcast on Turner Classic Movies.

Home media
The domestic version of the film has been released by the Warner Archive on DVD.

References

External links

1930 films
1930 musical comedy films
American black-and-white films
Remakes of American films
American football films
American musical comedy films
1930s English-language films
American films based on plays
Films directed by William A. Wellman
Films scored by Louis Silvers
Films set in universities and colleges
Warner Bros. films
1930s American films